Jacques Cronjé (born 4 August 1982) is a South African rugby union footballer who plays as a loose forward for the Springboks and for Racing Métro 92 Paris in the French Top 14. He is the brother of Geo Cronjé, who also played for South Africa.

Born in Klerksdorp in the North West Province, Cronjé made his provincial debut during 2001 for the Blue Bulls in a match against the Border Bulldogs in the Currie Cup competition. Two years later in 2003 he made his Super 12 (now Super Rugby) debut for the Bulls side, against fellow South African team, the Cats.

Cronjé made his international Test match debut for the Springboks on 12 June 2004 in a match against Ireland at the Free State Stadium in Bloemfontein, which South Africa won 31–17, and he scored his first Test try in a subsequent match against the Pacific Islands in a match at Gosford. He was not included in the 2007 Rugby World Cup Springbok squad, despite playing in the final preparation test against Namibia.

Cronjé was the strongest member of the Bulls team, being able to bench press 170 kg (375 lbs), and is also noted for his speed and wonderful ball-handling skills. He signed a two-year contract with French club Biarritz Olympique in August 2007 and joined them after the 2007 Currie Cup Premier Division season.

Notes

External links
 
 Springbok information

1982 births
Living people
South African rugby union players
South Africa international rugby union players
Bulls (rugby union) players
Blue Bulls players
Biarritz Olympique players
Racing 92 players
University of Pretoria alumni
People from Klerksdorp
Rugby union flankers
Rugby union locks
Rugby union number eights
Rugby union players from North West (South African province)